John Norman Mather (June 9, 1942 – January 28, 2017) was a mathematician at Princeton University known for his work on singularity theory and  Hamiltonian dynamics. He was descended from Atherton Mather (1663–1734), a cousin of Cotton Mather.  His early work dealt with the stability of smooth mappings between smooth manifolds of dimensions n (for the source manifold N) and p (for the target manifold P). He determined the precise dimensions (n,p) for which smooth mappings are stable with respect to smooth equivalence by diffeomorphisms of the source and target (i.e., infinitely differentiable coordinate changes).<ref>Mather, J. N. "Stability of C∞ mappings. VI: The nice dimensions". ``Proceedings of Liverpool Singularities-Symposium, I (1969/70), Lecture Notes in Math., Vol. 192, Springer, Berlin (1971), 207–253.</ref>

Mather also proved the conjecture of the French topologist René Thom that under topological equivalence smooth mappings are generically stable: the subset of the space of smooth mappings between two smooth manifolds consisting of the topologically stable mappings is a dense subset in the smooth Whitney topology. His notes on the topic of topological stability are still a standard reference on the topic of topologically stratified spaces.

In the 1970s, Mather switched to the field of dynamical systems. He made the following main contributions to dynamical systems that deeply influenced the field.

1. He introduced the concept of Mather spectrum and gave a characterization of Anosov diffeomorphisms.

2. Jointly with Richard McGehee, he gave an example of collinear four-body problem which has initial conditions leading to solutions that blow up in finite time. This was the first result that made the Painlevé conjecture plausible.

3. He developed a variational theory for the globally action minimizing orbits for twist maps (convex Hamiltonian systems of two degrees of freedom), along the line of the work of George David Birkhoff, Marston Morse, Gustav A. Hedlund, et al. This theory is now known as Aubry–Mather theory.Bangert, Victor. "Mather sets for twist maps and geodesics on tori." Dynamics reported. Vieweg+ Teubner Verlag, 1988. 1–56.

4. He developed the Aubry–Mather theory in higher dimensions, a theory which is now called Mather theory.Mather, John N. "Variational construction of connecting orbits." Annales de l'Institut Fourier, Vol. 43. No. 5. 1993. This theory turned out to be deeply related to the viscosity solution theory of Michael G. Crandall, Pierre-Louis Lions et al. for Hamilton–Jacobi equation. The link was revealed in the weak KAM theory of Albert Fathi.

5. He announced a proof of Arnold diffusion for nearly integrable Hamiltonian systems with three degrees of freedom. He prepared the technique, formulated a proper concept of genericity and made some important progresses towards its solution.

6. In a series of papers,Mather, John N. "Commutators of diffeomorphisms: II." Commentarii Mathematici Helvetici 50.1 (1975): 33-40. he proved that for certain regularity r, depending on the dimension of the smooth manifold M,  the group Diff(M, r) is perfect, i.e. equal to its own commutator subgroup, where Diff(M, r) is the group of C^r diffeomorphisms of a smooth manifold M that are isotopic to the identity through a compactly supported C^r'' isotopy. He also constructed counterexamples where the regularity-dimension condition is violated.

Mather was one of the three editors of the Annals of Mathematics Studies series published by Princeton University Press.

He was a member of the National Academy of Sciences beginning in 1988. He received the John J. Carty Award of the National Academy of Sciences in 1978 (for pure mathematics) and the George David Birkhoff Prize in applied mathematics in 2003. He also received the Brazilian Order of Scientific Merit in 2000 and the Brouwer Medal from the Royal Dutch Mathematical Society in 2014.

See also
 List of members of the National Academy of Sciences

References

External links
 Mather notes on Topological Stability (on the Princeton University website, pdf file)
 John Mather bibliography on the Princeton University website (pdf file)

 Obituary on the Princeton University website

1942 births
2017 deaths
Members of the United States National Academy of Sciences
20th-century American mathematicians
21st-century American mathematicians
Princeton University faculty
Recipients of the Great Cross of the National Order of Scientific Merit (Brazil)
Brouwer Medalists
Harvard University alumni
Princeton University alumni
Institute for Advanced Study visiting scholars
Dynamical systems theorists
People from Los Angeles
Mathematicians from California